The 1960 California Golden Bears football team was an American football team that represented the University of California, Berkeley in the Athletic Association of Western Universities (AAWU) during the 1960 NCAA University Division football season. In its first year under head coach Marv Levy, the team compiled a 2–7–1 record (1–3 against AAWU opponents), finished in fourth place in the AAWU, and was outscored by its opponents by a combined total of 195 to 93.

The team's statistical leaders included Randy Gold with 696 passing yards, Steve Bates with 384 rushing yards, and Dave George with 128 receiving yards. Cal center Dick Carlson received recognition from the Associated Press (AP) as a second-team player on the 1960 All-Pacific Coast football team.

Schedule

References

California
California Golden Bears football seasons
California Golden Bears football